North Carolina Highway 172 (NC 172) is a primary state highway in the U.S. state of North Carolina; it is entirely in Onslow County. It is also unique in that over half of this highway travels through Marine Corps Base Camp Lejeune on federal grounds.

Route description
The entire routing of NC 172 is in Onslow County split in the middle by Camp Lejeune. The route's southern terminus is at US 17 in the unincorporated community of Folkstone, located between Holly Ridge and Wilmington. The road heads east-northeast through a mix of forest land and small houses towards the community of Sneads Ferry. About  from its terminus, it intersects NC 210. It then starts to bend towards the north forming the border of the Sneads Ferry census-designated place. The Lakeside Drive/Old Ferry Road intersection is the last intersection that is accessible by the public along the southern segment of NC 172. North of there, the road crosses the New River before reaching the gate to Camp Lejeune. Through Camp Lejeune, the closed road heads east then north through mostly forested lands of the base. The road reopens at its intersection with Bear Creek Road, just north of a gate. On this segment of the road, NC 172 heads north passing forestland on the west side of the road and some houses on the east. The signed highway ends at a signalized intersection with NC 24 in Starling near Hubert.

History
April 2007: Travel through the Camp Lejeune section of the highway is restricted to vehicles with U.S. Department of Defense decals as a security measure.

Junction list

References

172
Transportation in Onslow County, North Carolina